Two ships of the United States Navy have been named USS Dubuque, after the city of Dubuque, Iowa.

  was a gunboat first commissioned in 1905 and seeing periodic service until 1945.

United States Navy ship names